La Selva del Camp is a municipality in the province of Tarragona, Catalonia, northern Spain.

The Prades Mountains are located in the vicinity of this municipality.

Main sights 

Parish church of Sant Andreu
Castle (12th century)
Convent of St. Raphael (17th century)
St. Antony Gate
Pont Alt (Old Bridge, rebuilt in the 16th century)
Church of Sant Pau (13th century)
Hermitage of Sant Pere del Puig (12th century)
Hermitage of Santa Maria de Paretdelgada
Chapel of St. Nicholas

Notable people
Ventura Gassol (1893-1980), writer and politician

References

External links
 Official website
 Government data pages 

Municipalities in Baix Camp
Populated places in Baix Camp